Grimmenthal station is a railway station in Grimmenthal, Thuringia, Germany.

References

Railway stations in Thuringia
Buildings and structures in Schmalkalden-Meiningen
Railway stations in Germany opened in 1858